Alan Martello (born 14 September 1952) is a former Australian rules footballer who played for the Hawthorn Football Club and Richmond Football Club in the Victorian Football League (VFL). 

Martello was Hawthorn's regular centre half-forward for much of the 1970s and a prodigious kicker of the football, Martello was the youngest man ever to reach 200 games. Martello left Hawthorn in 1980 after a bitter dispute and played in a losing Grand Final for Richmond in 1982.

Following his playing career he had a long broadcasting career with 3AW as a commentator on the station's AFL coverage.

Honours and achievements 
Hawthorn
 3× VFL premiership player: 1971, 1976, 1978
 2× Minor premiership: 1971, 1975

Richmond
 Minor premiership: 1982

Individual
 Hawthorn life member
 VFL/AFL Italian Team of the Century

References

Bibliography
 Hogan P: The Tigers Of Old, Richmond FC, Melbourne 1996

External links
 
 

1952 births
Australian rules footballers from Victoria (Australia)
Hawthorn Football Club players
Hawthorn Football Club Premiership players
Richmond Football Club players
Living people
Three-time VFL/AFL Premiership players